The LGV Atlantique  (French: Ligne à Grande Vitesse; English: Atlantic high-speed line) is a high-speed rail line running from Paris (Gare Montparnasse) to Western France. It opened in 1989–1990 and comprises two stations: Massy TGV station and Vendôme-Villiers-sur-Loir TGV station. It divides into two parts at Courtalain, one going westward to Le Mans (towards Brittany and Pays de la Loire), the second one going southwestward to Tours (and onward towards Nouvelle-Aquitaine). Both branches have been extended, by the LGV Bretagne-Pays de la Loire and the LGV Sud Europe Atlantique.

Route

The line leaves Gare Montparnasse to cross Paris's southern suburbs, partly under the Coulée Verte. This is a tunnel above which footpaths and recreational areas have been created, to reduce the effect of the LGV running through the area. The line at this point follows the route of the former railway line from Paris to Chartres. TGVs coming from the north or southeast of France via the LGV Interconnexion Est join the line at Massy. After the new Massy TGV station, the line passes through the Villejust tunnel and then follows the A10 motorway. Near the Saint-Arnoult toll plaza, the LGV turns south and leaves the motorway. The line then follows the ligne classique from Paris to Vendôme until the junction at Courtalain.

Stations
The LGV Atlantique serves the following stations:
Paris Montparnasse
Massy TGV
Le Mans1
Vendôme TGV
Tours

1 Le Mans is located on the western branch of the LGV Atlantique.

History 
 1 January 1983: creation of SNCF new line no. 2 committee
 25 May 1984: public utility declaration
 15 February 1985: official beginning of works at Boinville-le-Gaillard
 1 July 1987: laying of first LGV Atlantique rail at Auneau
 24 September 1989: line opens from Montrouge to Connerré
 18 May 1990: TGV world speed record of 515.3 km/h
 25 September 1990: southwestern branch opens
 27 December 1990: baby born on a TGV Atlantique train

Extensions 

Extensions to both branches have been built.  The western branch is augmented by the LGV Bretagne-Pays de la Loire project, resulting in a reduction of 37 minutes between Paris and Rennes.  The Southern branch is augmented by the LGV Sud Europe Atlantique project, resulting in a reduction of around 50 minutes to Tours and Bordeaux.  Both lines entered service in July 2017.

See also 
 High-speed rail in France

References

External links
High-speed rail lines site (in French)

Atlantique